The Arabian Desert is a vast desert wilderness in Western Asia that occupies almost the entire Arabian Peninsula. It stretches from Yemen to the Persian Gulf and Oman to Jordan and Iraq. It is the fifth largest desert in the world, and the largest in Asia. At its center is Ar-Rub' al-Khali (The Empty Quarter), one of the largest continuous bodies of sand in the world. It is an extension of the Sahara Desert.

Gazelles, oryx, sand cats, and spiny-tailed lizards are just some of the desert-adapted species that survive in this extreme environment, which features everything from red dunes to deadly quicksand. It is part of the deserts and xeric shrublands biome and lie in biogeographical realms of the Palearctic (northern part) and Afrotropical (southern part).

The Arabian Desert ecoregion has little biodiversity, although a few endemic plants grow here. Many species, such as the striped hyena, jackal and honey badger have died out as a result of hunting, habitat destruction, overgrazing by livestock, off-road driving, and human encroachment on their habitat. Other species, such as the Arabian sand gazelle, have been successfully re-introduced and are protected at a number of reserves.

Geography

The desert lies mostly in Saudi Arabia, and covers most of the country. It extends into neighboring portions of southern Iraq, southern Jordan, central Qatar, most of the Abu Dhabi emirate in the United Arab Emirates (UAE), western Oman, and northeastern Yemen. The ecoregion also includes most of the Sinai Peninsula in Egypt and the adjacent Negev desert in southern Israel.

Features
 The Rub' al-Khali desert is a sedimentary basin stretching along a south-west to north-east axis across the Arabian Shelf. The sands are predominantly silicates, composed of 80 to 90% quartz and the remainder feldspar, whose iron oxide-coated grains color the sands orange, purple, and red.
 A corridor of sandy terrain known as the Ad-Dahna desert connects the An-Nafud desert (65,000 km2 or 40,389 square miles) in the north of Saudi Arabia to the Rub' al-Khali in the south-east.
 The Tuwaiq escarpment is an  arc that includes limestone cliffs, plateaus, and canyons.
 There are brackish salt flats, including the quicksands of Umm al Samim.
 The Wahiba Sands of Oman are an isolated sand sea bordering the east coast.

Climate
The Arabian Desert has a subtropical, hot desert climate, similar to the climate of the Sahara Desert (the world's largest hot desert). The Arabian Desert is actually an extension of the Sahara Desert over the Arabian peninsula. 

The climate is mainly dry.

The Arabian Desert’s sunshine duration index is very high by global standards: between 2,900 hours (66.2% of daylight hours) and 3,600 hours (82.1% of daylight hours), but typically around 3,400 hours (77.6% of daylight hours).  Thus clear-sky conditions with plenty of sunshine prevail over the region throughout the year and cloudy periods are infrequent. 

Visibility at ground level is relatively low, despite the brightness of the sun and moon, because of dust and humidity. 

Temperatures remain high all year round. In extremely low-lying areas, especially along the Persian Gulf (near sea level), summer temperatures can reach . Record high temperatures above  have been reached in many areas of the desert, partly because its overall elevation is relatively low.

Flora
The Arabian Desert ecoregion has about 900 species of plants.

The Rub'al-Khali has very limited floristic diversity. There are only 37 plant species, 20 recorded in the main body of the sands and 17 around the outer margins. Of these 37 species, one or two are endemic. Vegetation is very diffuse but fairly evenly distributed, with some interruptions of near sterile dunes. Some typical plants are Calligonum crinitum on dune slopes, Cornulaca arabica (saltbush), Salsola stocksii (saltbush), and Cyperus conglomeratus. Other widespread species are Dipterygium glaucum, Limeum arabicum, and Zygophyllum mandavillei.
Very few trees are found except at the outer margin (typically Acacia ehrenbergiana and Prosopis cineraria). Other species are a woody perennial Calligonum comosum, and annual herbs such as Danthonia forskallii.

Fauna
The Arabian Desert has 102 native species of mammals. Native mammals include the Arabian oryx (Oryx leucoryx), sand gazelle (Gazella marica), mountain gazelle (G. gazella), Nubian ibex (Capra nubiana), Arabian wolf (Canis lupus arabs), striped hyaena (Hyaena hyaena), caracal (Caracal caracal), sand cat (Felis margarita), red fox (Vulpes vulpes), and Cape hare (Lepus capensis).

The Asiatic cheetah and Asiatic lion used to live in the Arabian Desert.

The ecoregion is home to 310 bird species.

People, language and cultures 
The area is home to several different cultures, languages, and peoples, with Islam as the predominant faith. The major ethnic group in the region is the Arabs, whose primary language is Arabic.

Settlements
In the center of the desert lies Riyadh, the capital of Saudi Arabia, with more than 7 million inhabitants. Other large cities, such as Dubai, Abu Dhabi, or Kuwait City, lie on the coast of the Persian Gulf.

Natural resources 
Natural resources available in the Arabian Desert include oil, natural gas, phosphates, and sulfur.

Conservation and threats 
Threats to the ecoregion include overgrazing by livestock and feral camels and goats, wildlife poaching, and damage to vegetation by off-road driving.

The conservation status of the desert is critical/endangered. In the UAE, the sand gazelle and Arabian oryx are threatened, and honey badgers, jackals, and striped hyaenas already extirpated.

Protected areas
4.37% of the ecoregion is in protected areas.

Saudi Arabia has established a system of reserves overseen by the National Commission for Wildlife Conservation and Development (NCWCD).
 Harrat al-Harrah Reserve (12,150 km2), established in 1987, is on the border with Jordan and Iraq, and protects a portion of the stony basaltic Harrat al-Sham desert. The reserve includes rough terrain of black basaltic boulders and extinct volcanic cones from the middle Miocene. It provides habitat to over 250 species of plants, 50 species of birds, and 22 mammal species.
 'Uruq Bani Ma'arid Reserve (12,000 km2) is on the western edge of the Rub’ al-Khali. Arabian oryx and sand gazelle were reintroduced to the reserve in 1995. 
 Ibex Reserve (200 km2) is south of Riyadh. It protects Nubian ibex and a reintroduced  population of mountain gazelle.
 Al-Tabayq Special Nature Reserve is in northern Saudi Arabia, and protects a population of Nubian ibex.

Protected areas in the United Arab Emirates include Al Houbara Protected Area (2492.0 km2), Al Ghadha Protected Area (1087.51 km2), Arabian Oryx Protected Area (5974.47 km2), Ramlah Protected Area (544.44 km2), and Al Beda'a Protected Area (417.0 km2).

See also

 ʿĀd
 Iram of the Pillars

References

External links

 
 Arabian Desert (DOPA)
 Arabian Desert (Encyclopedia of Earth)

Arabian Peninsula
Deserts and xeric shrublands
Deserts of Asia
Deserts of Iraq
Deserts of Jordan
Deserts of Oman
Deserts of Saudi Arabia
Deserts of the United Arab Emirates
Deserts of Yemen
Ecoregions of Iraq
Ecoregions of Jordan
Ecoregions of Oman
Ecoregions of Saudi Arabia
Ecoregions of the United Arab Emirates
Ecoregions of Yemen
Ecoregions of Asia
Geography of Qatar
Geography of the Middle East
Natural history of Western Asia
Palearctic ecoregions
Sahara